George Abel Schreiner (August 21, 1875 - January 21, 1942) was a German-American war correspondent during World War I for the Associated Press.

Biography
He was born on August 21, 1875, in Avricourt, Alsace-Lorraine, Germany. He migrated to the United States on October 15, 1900. He was a war correspondent during World War I for the Associated Press. He died on January 21, 1942, in Daytona Beach, Florida.

External links
Should The War Correspondent be Resurrected? in Editor and Publisher Magazine on June 17, 1916
The Years in Warring Central Europe in the New York Times on March 3, 1918

References

1872 births
1942 deaths
War correspondents of World War I
Associated Press reporters
German emigrants to the United States